Who Killed Gail Preston? is a 1938 American crime film directed by Leon Barsha and starring Don Terry, Rita Hayworth, and Robert Paige.

Plot
When singer Gail Preston is murdered at the Swing Swing Club, inspector Tom Kellogg takes the case and finds that many at the club disliked the victim. Suspicion at first falls on a man named Owen, but when is also found dead, bandleader Swing Traynor becomes the prime suspect. Discovering that Preston was killed by a gun rigged to a spotlight, Kellogg gathers all the suspects in a room and trains the spotlight on each.

Cast
 Don Terry as Insp. Kellogg
 Rita Hayworth as Gail Preston
 Robert Paige as Swing Traynor 
 Wyn Cahoon as Ann Bishop
 Gene Morgan as Cliff Connolly

References

External links
Who Killed Gail Preston? at the Internet Movie Database

1938 films
American crime films
1938 crime films
Films directed by Leon Barsha
American black-and-white films
Columbia Pictures films
1930s American films
1930s English-language films